James Clayton Eubanks, better known as Clayster or Clay, is an American professional Call of Duty player for the Las Vegas Legion.

Early life 
Eubanks is from Winchester, Virginia, and attended West Virginia University.

Career 
Eubanks was the Major League Gaming (MLG) X Games 2014 gold medalist, playing with OpTic Gaming, and MVP of the Call of Duty Championship 2015, playing with Denial eSports. Eubanks went 1,400 days without a major win, until he and the  squad won the finals of the 2019 CWL Pro League to clinch the 2019 league championship and end the drought. 

References

Living people
1990s births
American esports players
Call of Duty players
FaZe Clan players
Denial Esports players
CompLexity Gaming players
Team Envy players
Team Kaliber players
People from Winchester, Virginia
West Virginia University alumni
OpTic Gaming players
Twitch (service) streamers